Twin Peaks, also known as Twin Peaks Mountain, is a volcanic peak on northern Vancouver Island in southwestern British Columbia, Canada, located  southwest of Port McNeill. It consists of andesite lava that was erupted three million years ago when the Alert Bay Volcanic Belt was volcanically active during the Pliocene period.

See also
 List of volcanoes in Canada
 Volcanism of Canada
 Volcanism of Western Canada

References

External links
 BC Names entry "Twin Peaks"
 Twin Peaks in the Canadian Mountain Encyclopedia

Volcanoes of British Columbia
One-thousanders of British Columbia
Northern Vancouver Island
Pliocene volcanoes
Extinct volcanoes
Rupert Land District